Rada Vidović (born 21 September 1979 in Sombor, SFR Yugoslavia) is a former Serbian female basketball player. She ended her career at Partizan.

References

External links
 Profile at eurobasket.com
 Rada Vidović- Accumulated Statistics, 2007 EuroCup Women

1979 births
Living people
Sportspeople from Sombor
Serbian women's basketball players
Serbian women's basketball coaches
Shooting guards
ŽKK Vojvodina players
ŽKK Spartak Subotica players
ŽKK Željezničar Sarajevo players
ŽKK Partizan players
Serbian expatriate basketball people in Israel
Serbian expatriate basketball people in Bosnia and Herzegovina
Serbian expatriate basketball people in Italy
Serbian expatriate basketball people in Sweden
Serbian expatriate basketball people in the Czech Republic
Serbian expatriate basketball people in Ukraine